A wide variety of gunpowder artillery weapons were created in the medieval and early modern period.

List

Bibliography

 Artillery: An Illustrated History of Its Impact,  Jeff Kinard.
 English Civil War Artillery 1642-51, Chris Henry, 2005, Osprey: Oxford.
 Science and Civilisation in China: Military technology: The gunpowder epic, Joseph Needham

References

Lists of artillery
Early Modern weapons
Medieval artillery
Gunpowder